San Bartolo Tutotepec is a town and one of the 84 municipalities of Hidalgo, in central-eastern Mexico. The municipality covers an area of 305.8 km².

As of 2005, the municipality had a total population of 17,837. In 2017 there were 5,716 inhabitants who spoke an indigenous language, primarily Otomi of the Sierra, Otomi of the valley of Mezquital, and to a lesser extent Tepehua.

References 

Municipalities of Hidalgo (state)
Populated places in Hidalgo (state)